Archaeotriton is an extinct genus of prehistoric salamanders. The only identified species in the genus is A. basalticus, which lived during the Oligocene in Central Europe.

See also
 List of prehistoric amphibians

References

Cenozoic salamanders
Oligocene amphibians
Paleogene amphibians of Europe
Fossil taxa described in 1859
Taxa named by Christian Erich Hermann von Meyer
Salamandridae
Prehistoric amphibian genera